Kul Prasad Uprety is a Nepalese politician. Uprety contested the 1991 Nepalese legislative election as a Communist Party of Nepal (Unified Marxist-Leninist) candidate in the Taplejung-1 seat. He won the election, defeating Nepali Congress candidate Mani Lama, with 12703 votes (47.19%). In the 1994 election, he was substituted by Ambika Sawa as the CPN(UML) candidate in the constituency.

When CPN(UML) was divided, Uprety joined the dissident Communist Party of Nepal (Marxist-Leninist). He contested the 1999 legislative election as the CPN(ML) candidate in Taplejung-1, obtaining 1289 votes. The election was won by CPN(UML) candidate Til Kumar Menyangbo Limbu.

References

Communist Party of Nepal (Unified Marxist–Leninist) politicians
Living people
Year of birth missing (living people)
Nepal MPs 1991–1994